Adventure Park USA is a small amusement park and arcade in Monrovia, Maryland, east of Frederick, Maryland, which opened in 2005.

Roller Coasters

Other Attractions 
 Outdoor attractions: Skycoaster, Crater Lake Bumper Boats, Road Runner Scrambler, Blazing Trail Go-Karts, Championship Miniature Golf, Gemstone Mining Co., Midway Games, Rattlesnake Tilt-a-Whirl, Carousel, Spinning Tea Cups, Sky Race
 Indoor attractions: West World Laser Tag, Rustler's Ridge Rock Wall, Hang 'Em High Ropes Course, Frog Hopper, Spin Zone Bumper Cars, Gold Rush Soft Playground, Stampede Arcade

References

Amusement parks in Maryland
2005 establishments in Maryland
Tourist attractions in Frederick County, Maryland
Amusement parks opened in 2005
Operating amusement attractions